Aaron Frank Mooy (born 15 September 1990) is an Australian professional soccer player who plays as a midfielder for Scottish Premiership club Celtic and the Australia national football team.

Born in Sydney, Mooy played youth football for the New South Wales Institute of Sport and Bolton Wanderers before making his professional debut with St Mirren. He returned to Sydney to play for Western Sydney Wanderers in 2012, and moved to Melbourne City two years later. Signing for Manchester City in 2016, Mooy was immediately loaned to Huddersfield Town and helped the club gain promotion to the Premier League. He signed with Huddersfield permanently in June 2017. In January 2020, Mooy was signed permanently by Premier League club Brighton & Hove Albion before moving to Shanghai SIPG in China during August 2020.

Mooy has been capped by the national team on over 50 occasions since his debut in 2012, netting a total of seven goals. He also played in the 2009 FIFA U-20 World Cup.

Club career

Bolton Wanderers
Mooy started his career in Europe as a youth scholar at Bolton Wanderers after being spotted by Chris Sulley. He rejected a contract extension from Bolton in July 2010 in search of more first team football.

St Mirren

Mooy joined Scottish Premier League club St Mirren when he had hair on 23 October 2010, and made his league debut for the Saints on the same day in a 3–0 loss to Hearts. On 18 January 2011, he scored his first goal for the club, in the fourth-round replay, in a 6–1 win over Peterhead. Having made 18 appearances and scoring once in all competitions, he was offered a new contract in April 2011 before agreeing a two-year contract with the club in May.

The 2011–12 season was marked by Mooy having suffered a stress fracture in his back. As months went by, his recovery started going well. Soon after, he went to a specialist to get over his injury. On 17 December 2011, Mooy made his return, coming as a substitute, in a 1–1 draw against Motherwell and the next game, he scored his first league goal for the club against Rangers at St Mirren Park on Christmas Eve 2011.

Western Sydney Wanderers
 

After leaving St Mirren on a free transfer, Mooy returned to Australia and was announced as one of the three inaugural signings for new A-League club Western Sydney Wanderers on 25 June. He made his debut in the opening game of the season in a 0–0 draw against Central Coast Mariners and on 23 February 2013, he scored his first goal, in a 1–0 win over Perth Glory. He made 23 appearances and scored one goal in his first season with the Wanderers, who won the Premiership and made the grand final in their inaugural season. Mooy took part in his second successive A-League grand final the following season, as the Wanderers were named runners-up to the Championship for the second time in a row.

Melbourne City
Mooy was released by Western Sydney Wanderers on 21 May 2014, and was announced to have joined A-League rivals Melbourne City the same day. He scored his first goal against Brisbane Roar, and also scored in both fixtures against his former club Western Sydney Wanderers. At the end of the season he claimed Melbourne City's Player of the Year award and was the club's top scorer that season, also racking up eight assists. Mooy became the youngest ever marquee player in A-League history when he re-signed with Melbourne City for the 2015–16 season. On 29 September, he scored a hat-trick against Heidelberg United in the FFA Cup quarter finals with two of the goals coming from outside the box, and in doing this he also became the first ever City player to score a hat-trick in the FFA Cup. During his time with Melbourne City, Socceroos manager Ange Postecoglou labelled him the "best and most exciting player in the A-League", while former Socceroo goalkeeper Mark Bosnich described him as "the best Australian midfielder playing anywhere in the world". Melbourne City were reported to have rejected a $2m offer for Mooy from Saudi Arabia club Al-Nassr. On 5 March 2016, he assisted Bruno Fornaroli for two of his three goals to move to 20 assists for the season; an all time A-League record.

Manchester City
Mooy was signed by Manchester City on a three-year deal on 30 June 2016.

Huddersfield Town
Six days after signing for Manchester City, Mooy was loaned to Championship side Huddersfield Town for the 2016–17 season. He made his Huddersfield debut in their 2–1 win over Brentford on 6 August, and scored his first goal for them on 10 September in a 1–0 win over Leeds United in a West Yorkshire derby. On 28 November 2016, he scored the equaliser in an eventual 2–1 loss at home to Wigan Athletic. Huddersfield Town fans voted Mooy as the best player of the season. Mooy was involved in the squad that won the play-off final, scoring one of Huddersfield's four penalties in the penalty shootout against Reading, which secured them Premier League status for the 2017–18 season, the first time in the club's history.

On 15 June 2017, it was reported that Huddersfield had agreed a fee with Manchester City to sign Mooy on a permanent basis. The fee was reported to be an initial £8 million, potentially rising to £10 million depending on add-ons. City would also have a buy-back clause for Mooy. The transfer was finalised on 30 June. Mooy made his Premier League debut for Huddersfield in their first game of the 2017–18 season, a 3–0 win over Crystal Palace, Mooy himself involved in two of the goals. He scored his first Premier League goal one week later, the only goal of the game as Huddersfield defeated Newcastle United. On 21 October 2017, Mooy scored the opening goal as Huddersfield upset Manchester United 2–1 in a Premier League clash at John Smith's Stadium.

Brighton & Hove Albion
On 8 August 2019, Mooy joined Brighton & Hove Albion on a season long loan from Huddersfield Town. Mooy made his debut for The Seagulls coming on as a substitute in a 1–1 home draw against West Ham United on 17 August. Mooy's first start for The Albion came in the EFL Cup on 27 August in a 2–1 away win over Bristol Rovers. He made his first league start for Brighton in a 0–0 away draw at Newcastle United on 21 September.

Mooy signed a permanent deal with Brighton on 24 January 2020, signing a three-and-a-half year contract.

Shanghai Port
On 28 August 2020, it was announced that Mooy had signed for Chinese Super League team Shanghai SIPG (now known as Shanghai Port) after activating a £4 million release clause. Brighton head coach Graham Potter said upon his departure "I have really enjoyed working with him, and on behalf of everyone at the club I would like to thank him for his contribution and wish him well for the future".

Celtic
On 19 July 2022, Mooy joined Celtic on a two-year deal. He made his official debut for Celtic in their opening matchday of the 2022-23 Scottish Premiership season against Aberdeen, coming on as a late substitute for Matt O'Riley in a 2–0 victory at Celtic Park.

On 6 September 2022, Mooy made his UEFA Champions League debut in a 3–0 home defeat against Real Madrid.

On 28 December 2022, Mooy scored his first goal and brace for Celtic against Hibernian at Easter Road in a 4–0 away victory. Notably, it was the first time Mooy had scored in Scottish football since Christmas Eve 2011 - where he done so as a St Mirren player against Rangers.

International career

Mooy was eligible to represent Germany or the Netherlands through his parents.

Mooy made 10 appearances for the Young Socceroos between 2008 and 2009 and scored four goals. He played at the 2009 FIFA U-20 World Cup and played in two group stage games before Australia were eliminated, scoring in his second game against Brazil. He was called up to the senior Australian side in August 2009, for a friendly match against the Republic of Ireland.

In late 2011, Mooy declared his desire to play for Australia at the 2012 Summer Olympics, however, they were unsuccessful in their qualifying campaign for London 2012.

On 7 December 2012, he made his international debut with the Socceroos against Guam scoring a free-kick to open the scoring in a game the Socceroos would win 9–0. In the following game against Chinese Taipei, Mooy again scored a free-kick as the Socceroos won 8–0 and qualified for the EAFF East Asian Cup.

On 11 March 2015, Mooy was selected in a squad to play Germany and Macedonia. On 3 September 2015, he scored the fifth goal in a 5–0 defeat of Bangladesh in a 2018 FIFA World Cup qualifier in Perth.

He also holds a Dutch passport due to his mother's heritage.

In May 2018 he was named in Australia's 23-man squad for the 2018 World Cup in Russia.

Mooy was named in Australia's squad for the 2022 FIFA World Cup in November 2022.

Career statistics

Club

International

As of match played 1 February 2022. Australia score listed first, score column indicates score after each Mooy goal.

Honours
Western Sydney Wanderers
A-League Premiership: 2012–13

Huddersfield Town
EFL Championship play-offs: 2017
Celtic

 Scottish League Cup: 2022–23

Individual
Melbourne City Player of the Year: 2014–15, 2015–16
PFA A-League Team of the Season: 2014–15, 2015–16
Fox Sports Alex Tobin Medal: 2014–15
PFA Footballer of the Year: 2015–16, 2016–17
EFL Team of the Season: 2016–17
PFA Team of the Year: 2016–17 Championship
Huddersfield Town Player of the Year: 2016–17

References

External links

Profile  at the Huddersfield Town A.F.C. website
Profile at the Football Federation Australia website

1990 births
Living people
Australian people of Dutch descent
Australian people of German descent
Soccer players from Sydney
Australian soccer players
Association football midfielders
Bolton Wanderers F.C. players
St Mirren F.C. players
Western Sydney Wanderers FC players
Melbourne City FC players
Manchester City F.C. players
Huddersfield Town A.F.C. players
Brighton & Hove Albion F.C. players
Shanghai Port F.C. players
Chinese Super League players
Scottish Premier League players
A-League Men players
Marquee players (A-League Men)
English Football League players
Premier League players
Scottish Professional Football League players
Australia youth international soccer players
Australia under-20 international soccer players
Australia international soccer players
2017 FIFA Confederations Cup players
2018 FIFA World Cup players
Australian expatriate soccer players
Australian expatriate sportspeople in China
Australian expatriate sportspeople in England
Australian expatriate sportspeople in Scotland
Expatriate footballers in China
Expatriate footballers in England
Expatriate footballers in Scotland
New South Wales Institute of Sport alumni
2022 FIFA World Cup players